Łojowice  is a village in the administrative district of Gmina Wiązów, within Strzelin County, Lower Silesian Voivodeship, in south-western Poland.

Between 1975 and 1998 it was in the administrative district of Wrocław. The entire region, being German-speaking, was annexed by Prussia in 1740 and therefore found itself in Germany from 1871 until population shifts and transfer of the land to Poland in 1945.

References

Villages in Strzelin County